Posta Sandstone also called Wehlen Sandstone (Wehlener Sandstein), only occurs on the eastern banks of the River Elbe at Alte Poste, near Herrenleithe, Wehlen, Zeichen and Posta. The thickness of the deposit is between 30 and 50 metres. It is also known as Überquader ("Over Ashlar") and has the smallest deposit of all the Elbe sandstones.  In 2008 it was being quarried in the areas around the village of Lohmen and in Wehlen.

Quarrying and use 
In 2008, Posta Sandstone was being won in two quarries in the Wesenitz valley and it was being used for solid window and door frames, façade slabs, sculptor's blocks and high-profile masonry work. It is used especially in restoration work and sometimes also in new structures. The following is a selection of the structures built in Posta Sandstone:
 Berlin:
 Ground floor of the Berlin Institute of Technology in Charlottenburg
 Dresden:
 Old Town (Altmarkt) (rebuilding after the Second World War)
 Bismarck towers
 Dresden Bank buildings
 Anne's Church
 Eckberg Castle
 Dresden central station
 Cosel Palace
 Church of Our Lady 
 Zwinger Palace, brown studio 
 Albrechtsberg Palace
 Hamburg:
 Villa Offen
 Magdeburg:
 Alte Wache
 Senftenberg:
 War memorials for the dead of World War I

See also 
 List of sandstones
 Cotta Sandstone
 Reinhardtsdorf Sandstone
 Wehlen Sandstone

Sources 
 W. Dienemann und O. Burre: Die nutzbaren Gesteine Deutschlands und ihre Lagerstätten mit Ausnahme der Kohlen, Erze und Salze, Enke-Verlag, Stuttgart 1929, p. 304ff 
 Siegfried Grunert: Der Elbsandstein: Vorkommen, Verwendung, Eigenschaften. In: Geologica Saxonica Journal of Central European Geology 52/53 (2007), p. 143-204 (Digitalisat)

External links 
Technical data on Posta Sandstone
Information about Elbe Sandstone
Laser cleaning of Posta Sandstone during restoration measures

References 

Sandstone
Elbe Sandstone Mountains
Quarries in Germany
Sächsische Schweiz-Osterzgebirge